"Spring för livet" is a 2011 song written by Fredrik Boström and Sara Varga, and performed by Sara Varga at Melodifestivalen 2011, during the third semifinal in Linköping, where the song reached Andra chansen, and later the final, ending up 9th. It also charted at Svensktoppen for 35 weeks. The song's lyrics gained attention for its depiction of abuse, serving as a contrast to the less serious topics common at Melodifestivalen.

Contributors
Fredrik Boström - bass, programming, Rhodes, percussion, guitar, producer
Janne Robertsson - drums
Lars Hägglund - drums
Jesper Nordenström - piano
Mattias Bylund - organ
Mija Folkesson - vocals

Charts

References

2011 singles
Melodifestivalen songs of 2011
Swedish-language songs
Sara Varga songs
2011 songs